The term  Alha Khand is used to refer to poetic works in Hindi which consists of a number of ballads describing the brave acts of two 12th century Banaphar heroes, Alha and Udal, generals working for king Paramardi-Deva (Parmal)  of Mahoba (1163-1202 CE) against Prithviraj Chauhan (1166–1192 CE) of Ajmer. The works has been entirely handed down by oral tradition and presently exists in many recensions, which differ from one another both in language and subject matter. The Bundeli, Bagheli, Awadhi, Bhojpuri, Maithili, and Kannauji recensions are the most well known among these.

The original language of this work has been continuously modernized over the centuries to suit the dialect of the reciter and it has been lost wholly in this process. This epical work is believed to have been written by Jagnayak (or Jagnik), a contemporary to Chand Bardai and the court poet of Chandela ruler Paramardi Deva (Parmal)  of Mahoba in Bundelkhand. The original work is now lost.

The ballads from this work are still sung during the monsoons by the professional bardic singers (known as the Alhets) in various parts of northern India, mostly in Bihar, eastern Uttar Pradesh and northern Madhya Pradesh. 
There are two main version of texts.

Mahoba Khand: This work was discovered as a manuscript by Shyamsundar Das in 1901 as one of the two sections of a manuscript labelled "Prithviraj Raso". Shyamsundar Das concluded that it is separate text and published it using the title Parmal Raso in 1919.  It has 36 cantos, starting from the origin of the Chandellas and ends with Alha becoming a disciple of yogi Gorakhnath and retiring to forests as a monk. The author laments on the end of the Hindu kingdoms and the beginning of the Pathan rule. It uses the traditional metres like doha, chaupai, chhappaya etc.

Mahoba Samaya is a section of some of the Prithviraj Raso manuscripts. The story given is essentially the same as in Mahoba Khand. It however does not have a section on the origin of Chandellas.

Alha-khand:  With 23 cantos, starting with Pritvhiraj winning over Sanyogita and ending with Bela becoming sati.  In 1865, Charles Elliott compiled a recension by collating various oral versions into 23 cantos and this recension was the basis of the first printed edition in 1871. Later George Abraham Grierson enlarged this recension with additional inputs. Portions of this recension was translated into English ballad metre by William Waterfield, under the title of The Nine-Lakh Chain or the Maro Feud (1876). Later, this translation, along with the abstracts of the untranslated portions and an introduction written by Grierson was published under the title of The Lay of Alha: A Saga of Rajput Chivalry as Sung by Minstrels of Northern India (1923).

The most popular version of Alha-Khand is the text written by Lalitaprasad Mishra, composed at the request of Prayag Narayan, the son of Munshi Nawal Kishore in Samvat 1956 (1900 CE). The work was written in the Alha metre. It has the same 23 cantos as The Lay of Alha, but has much more detailed narration.

Characters
 Banaphars: Brothers Dasraj (sons Alha, father of Indal, and Udan), Bachchharaj (sons Malkhan and Sulkhan), Todar, Rahmal.
 Chandelas: King Parmal married to Malhna (sister of Parihar Mahil), sons Brahmanand (married to Bela (daughter of Prathviraj), Ranjit, daughter Chandrabal.
 Jagnik: the author, son of Parmal's sister
 Jaichand: last king of Kannauj
 Mir Talhan: The Sayyad who accompanies the Banaphars, with 9 sons and 18 grandsons.
 Prithviraj Chauhan: the father of Bela

Contents
The heroes of this poem are two brothers, Alha and Udal (or Udan), the generals of Parmal’s army who fought in the battle of Mahoba between Prithviraj III and Parmal in c.1182. The narration begins with the early exploits of Alha and Udal. They fought with the Karingarai (or Kalingarai) and killed him to avenge the killings of their father Dassaraj (or Dasraj) and uncle Baccharaj.  Later they fought the battle of Mahoba.  According to the Bhojpuri and the Kannauji recensions, Alha married Sonvati (Sonva), the princess of Nainagarh (Chunar), while according to the some other Western Hindi recensions he married Macchil, the daughter of Raghomacch of Haridwar. Apart from Alha and Udal, the brave deeds of other heroes like Malkhan and Sulkhan (the sons of Baccharaj), Brahamjit (the son of Parmal) and Talhan Syed are also described in this work. This work narrates the details of fifty-two wars in total.

Historicity
While the poetic licence is apparent in the modern versions of the ballads, the attack of Prithviraj Chauhan is directly attested by two inscriptions of 1182CE at Madanpur near Lalitpur in a Jain temple.

Alha is sometimes called Alhan. Alhan (अल्हण) was a popular name in 12-13th century in North India.

The genealogy of Chandela ruler Parmal (Parmardi) given in Mahoba Khand or Alha Khand does not match the genealogy given in Chandela inscriptions. In Mahoba Khand, the father, grandfather and the great-grandfather of Parmal are given as Kirtibramha, Madanbrahma, and Rahilbramha. While Madanavarman (1129-1163), Kirttivarman (1070-1098) and Rahila (9th century) were indeed ancestors of Paramardi (1166-1202), most names and the sequence do not match.

The Alha Khand states the end of the Chandellas after Parmal. That is not supported by history. The Chandelas became very weak after the attack by Prithviraj, but the dynasty lingered on at least until 1308, i.e. another century.

A Jain temple in Chhatarpur has an Adinath image installed in Samvat 1208 (1151 AD). According to one reading of the inscription, it mentions  Alha, Udal and the entire group. However other scholars have read the inscription differently.

During the Chandella rule, Aharji was a flourishing Jain center in Bundelkhand. It was the site of a massive pratishta in samvat 1237 (1180 CE), many images bearing that date have been found, including a monumental image that mention Paramardideva as the ruling king. With the exception of a single samvat 1241 image, the activity ceased as a result of the Chandella defeat in samvat 1239.

In popular culture 

 Sabse Bade Ladaiya, a television series based on the ballad aired on DD National from 2012.

See also
Veer Lorik

References

External links
 आल्ह- ऊदल लोककथा A website on the Alha Khand (in Hindi).
 

Hindi-language literature
Indian legends
Indian folklore
Mahoba
Bundelkhand
Chahamanas of Shakambhari
Medieval Indian literature
Rajput culture
Bundeli-language films
Awadh
Bhojpuri-language culture
Maithili literature
Kannauj
Chandelas of Jejakabhukti
Uttar Pradesh folklore
Indian literature
History of Madhya Pradesh